ENS Bernees (FFG 1003) is a FREMM multipurpose frigate of the Egyptian Navy. Bernees was originally constructed as the Carlo Bergamini-class Emilio Bianchi before being acquired by Egypt and being renamed.

Development and design 
Planning assumptions for the Italian Navy are for ten FREMM-IT vessels comprising four anti-submarine warfare (ASW) variants and six general-purpose (GP) variants at a cost of €5.9 billion. In the 2013 Italian budget, the Italian government laid out the necessary financing for two more GP variants (FREMM-IT 7 & 8) and the contract was awarded in September 2013. On 15 April 2015, the Italian Parliament confirmed the deal between OCCAR and Orizzonte Sistemi Navali Spa (Fincantieri and Finmeccanica, since 2017 Leonardo) to begin building units 9 and 10, for 764 million Euros.

As of 16 April 2015, the Italian government has approved funding for all ten FREMM-IT to be delivered to the Italian Navy (4 ASW variants and 6 GP variants).

FREMM-IT 9 & 10 will have undisclosed enhanced capabilities. All ten Italian FREMM-ITs have extended ant-air warfare capabilities, with SAAM-ESD CMS, Aster 30 and Aster 15 missiles for extended area defence. SAAM-ESD CMS use Leonardo MFRA, a 3D active radar (AESA), an evolved version of the Leonardo EMPAR PESA radar (previously embarked on s and the aircraft carrier ). Since the seventh FREMM-IT, there will be updates, such as new conformal IFF antenna and much more stealth response. Since the ninth FREMM-IT, SCLAR-H replaced with Leonardo ODLS-20. In 2017 the Italian FREMM refit started with the installation on each of two SITEP MS-424 acoustic guns.

In 2020 it was reported that Italy would sell its last two FREMM-class frigates in the current production line (Spartaco Schergat and Emilio Bianchi) to Egypt. Spartaco Schergat was in the final stage of her sea trials while Emilio Bianchi would follow within one year. The deal reportedly also involved other military equipment and was worth 1.2 billion Euros. It was reported that Italy would then order two additional FREMM frigates to replace those transferred to Egypt with the anticipated delivery of the replacements by 2024.

Some sensitive equipment was deleted from the original Italian design, including the EW suite’s jammers, NETTUNO-4100 RECM system and Thales Altesse CESM equipment. SATCOM antennas were also removed from the communication suite.

Construction and career 
On 25 January 2020, the launching ceremony of the ship took place at the Fincantieri plants in Riva Trigoso. She is expected to be commissioned in April 2021. On 24 February 2021, she left La Spezia to undergo her first sea trial. The vessel was delivered to the Egyptian Navy in April 2021.

References 

Ships built by Fincantieri 
2020 ships 
Ships built in Italy
Bergamini-class frigates (2011)
Frigates of the Egyptian Navy